Rodići is a village in the municipality of Jablanica, Bosnia and Herzegovina.

Demographics 
According to the 2013 census, its population was 15, all Bosniaks.

References

Populated places in Jablanica, Bosnia and Herzegovina